Bicilia is a genus of moths of the family Crambidae.

Species
Bicilia iarchasalis (Walker, 1859)
Bicilia lentistrialis (Dognin, 1906)
Bicilia olivia (Butler, 1878)
Bicilia persinualis (Hampson, 1899)

References

Spilomelinae
Crambidae genera
Taxa named by Hans Georg Amsel